Humphrey Wells was an American politician who served as the Governor of Georgia for only two days, from February 16, 1780, to February 18, 1780. He resigned the office to Stephen Heard. Before that, he served as a member of the Executive Council of Georgia.

References

Governors of Georgia (U.S. state)
Year of birth unknown
Year of death unknown
Independent state governors of the United States
Georgia (U.S. state) Independents